Sarah Ann Watt (30 August 19584 November 2011) was an Australian film director, writer and animator.

Biography
Born in Sydney, Watt completed a Graduate Diploma of Film and Television (Animation) at the Swinburne Film and Television School (now Victorian College of the Arts), Melbourne in 1990.  Her student film Catch of the Day was to reflect the style of future work. In 1995, she directed a short film, Small Treasures, which won Best Short Film at the Venice Film Festival. In 2000, she made a program for the SBS series Swim Between the Flags called "Local Dive". It was made concurrently with another project that she was directing called "The Way of the Birds" based on the 1996 book of the same name by author Meme McDonald. She received the Australian Film Institute's award for Best Director for her 2005 film Look Both Ways.

Watt returned to the Victorian College of the Arts School of Film and Television to teach animation and was to assist in the development of many animators including Academy Award winner Adam Eliot in 1996.  Watt was instrumental in the development of scripts for all of her students, but left the school to further develop her own projects, returning on occasion as a script and final production assessor.

Watt was also a published author, she wrote and illustrated the picture book Clem Always Could and co-authored Worse Things Happen at Sea with William McInnes.

During the post-production of Look Both Ways, Watt was diagnosed with cancer. Her second film My Year Without Sex was released in 2009.

She died on 4 November 2011 after suffering for six years from breast and bone cancer, aged 53.

Sarah Watt was married to actor William McInnes. They have two children, Clem (b. 1993) and Stella (b. 1998).

Awards 
Watt has won and been nominated for a number of awards:

Won 
 2013- Byron Kennedy Award at the AACTA Awards 
 2009- Grass Award at the Australian Directors Guild for My Year Without Sex
 2006- Best Direction of a First Feature Film at the Australian Screen Directors' Association Awards (now the Australian Directors Guild) for Look Both Ways
 2006- Best Screenplay at the Mar del Plata Film Festival for Look Both Ways
 2006- Propeller of Motovum at the Motovun Film Festival for Look Both Ways
 2006- Critics Award at the NatFilm Festival for Look Both Ways
 2006- KNF Award at the Rotterdam International Film Festival for Look Both Ways
 2005- Best Direction at the Australian Film Institute Awards (now the AACTA Awards) for Look Both Ways
 2005- Best Original Screenplay at the Australian Film Institute Awards (now the AACTA Awards) for Look Both Ways
 2005- Best Film at the Film Critics Circle of Australia Awards for Look Both Ways
 2005- Best Director at the Film Critics Circle of Australia Awards for Look Both Ways
 2005- Best Screenplay- Original at the Film Critics Circle of Australia for Look Both Ways
 2005- Best Direction at the Inside Film Awards for Look Both Ways
 2005- Best Script at the Inside Film Awards for Look Both Ways
 2005- FIPRESCI Prize at the Brisbane International Film Festival for Look Both Ways
 2001- Best Short Animation at the Australian Film Institute Awards (now the AACTA Awards) for Living with Happiness
 1996- Special Jury Prize at the Hiroshima International Animation Festival for Small Treasures
 1995- OCIC Award at the Melbourne International Film Festival for Small Treasures

Nominated 
 2009- Best Screenplay- Original at the Australian Film Institute Awards (now the AACTA Awards) for My Year Without Sex
 2006- Best Film at the Mar del Plata Film Festival for Look Both Ways
 2005- Best Feature at the Chicago International Film Festival for Look Both Ways
 2005- Screen International Award at the European Film Awards for Look Both Ways
 2005- Best Feature Film at the Inside Film Awards for Look Both Ways
 2000- Best Short Animation Film at the Australian Film Institute Awards (now the AACTA Awards) for The Way of the Birds
 1995- Best Short Film at the Chicago International Film Festival for Small Treasures

References

External links

Interviews and writing 
Interview with Sarah Watt on Australian Story 
When I'm gone ... The Age, 21 October 2011
Sarah Watt's blog
Interview about Watt's other occupations with Steve Dow
A Tribute to Sarah Watt in Senses of Cinema Issue 61

Films 

'Look Both Ways' (2005) on Australian Screen Online
Small Treasures (1995) on Australian Screen Online
Living with Happiness (2001) on Australian Screen Online

1958 births
2011 deaths
Australian film directors
Australian animated film directors
Australian women film directors
Australian women animators
Australian animators
Australian women writers
Australian writers
Swinburne University of Technology alumni
Deaths from breast cancer
Deaths from bone cancer
Deaths from cancer in Victoria (Australia)